Anokhi Pehchan is a 1972 Bollywood drama film directed by Satyen Bose. The film stars Sanjay Khan and Raakhee.

Cast
Sanjay Khan
Raakhee
Simi Garewal
Nirupa Roy
Jagdeep
Mohan Choti

Soundtrack

References

External links
 

1972 films
1970s Hindi-language films
1972 drama films
Films scored by Kalyanji Anandji
Indian drama films
Hindi-language drama films